The Vixen is the stage name of Anthony Taylor, an American drag performer, best known for competing on the tenth season of RuPaul's Drag Race and placing seventh. Her appearance on the show was notable for raising a conversation around racial dynamics both among her fellow drag queens and in the show’s fandom. She is the founder of Black Girl Magic, a drag show consisting of only African-American queens. In August 2020, she released Commercial Break, her debut album.

Early life 
Taylor was born to Sheri Jones. He started doing drag at a local bar called the Jeffery Pub in April 2013. His drag mother is Savannah Westbrooke. The drag name "The Vixen" comes from his love of 1920s vintage wear, and the word "vixen" comes in those searches.

Career 
The Vixen is known for blending political activism and queer advocacy into her drag performances. She has been an outspoken critic about anti-black sentiment in America, including in white queer communities, stating, “you [often] have to choose between calling out racism or homophobia”.

In November 2016, Taylor co-founded "Black Girl Magic", a drag show consisting of only African-American queens. Drag Race alumni Dida Ritz and Shea Couleé are part of this show. Her fellow season ten contestants Asia O'Hara, Monét X Change and Monique Heart were added to the line-up of the "Black Girl Magic" cast in June 2018.

The Vixen was announced as one of fourteen contestants for season ten of RuPaul's Drag Race on February 22, 2018. She won the episode two main challenge. In the third episode, she engaged in a verbal back-and-forth with fellow contestant Aquaria, which left Aquaria crying and The Vixen noting that the exchange “created the narrative [of] an angry black woman who has scared off the little white girl". Although Aquaria eventually conceded the point and later came to her defense, the Vixen received online death threats from Drag Race fans afterwards. She faced more backlash after quarreling with competitor Eureka O'Hara in multiple episodes, most notably in episode 4 of Untucked. She was eliminated in seventh place after losing a lip sync to "Groove Is in the Heart" against Asia O'Hara. During the final reunion episode, she walked offstage after feeling cornered by moderator RuPaul who kept pressing her to revisit past confrontations with Aquaria and Eureka. Season six alum Courtney Act later criticized RuPaul for a lack of compassion during the exchange.

Outside of Drag Race, The Vixen had a booth covered with the Black Girl Magic logo for the first annual Wakandacon in August 2018.

She became a sponsor for Grindr's "Kindr" public service announcement in September 2018, in an effort to stop racial discrimination in the app.

On March 5 and 6, 2020 Vixen performed alongside fellow drag race alumni Bebe Zahara Benet, Bob the Drag Queen, Monique Heart, Peppermint, and Shea Couleé in the Nubia tour, a live drag show featuring and produced by black drag queens.

In 2020 Taylor started a career in pornography, selling sexually explicit videos and pictures via OnlyFans.

Music
Before her stint on Drag Race, The Vixen was a featured guest on Couleé's 2017 song "Cocky". She released her first solo single, "Room pt. 1," in March 2018. She released "Room pt. 2" on September 28, 2018, with Couleé featured on the track. The Vixen was featured with other Chicago drag queens on the song "Drag" by Dorian Electra. On October 17, 2018, she released the song "Demons, Witches & Bitches" with DJ Shilow and Aja.
 The Vixen's single "Tea Party" was released on December 11, 2018. She released her debut album, Commercial Break, on August 4, 2020.

Personal life 
The Vixen is openly gay. Her drag daughter is Delikate Doll.

Filmography

Movies

Television

Music videos

Web series

Discography

Albums

Singles

Lead artist

Featured artist

References

External links 
 
 

1990 births
Living people
African-American drag queens
American anti-racism activists
American LGBT rights activists
Columbia College Chicago alumni
Gay entertainers
LGBT African Americans
LGBT people from Illinois
OnlyFans creators
People from Chicago
RuPaul's Drag Race contestants